Sir Laurence Rivers Dunne, MC (4 October 1893 – 30 June 1970) was a British barrister and magistrate who served as Chief Metropolitan Stipendiary Magistrate from 1948 to 1960.

References 

 

Knights Bachelor
1970 deaths
English barristers
Members of the Inner Temple
People educated at Eton College
Alumni of Magdalen College, Oxford
King's Royal Rifle Corps officers
Recipients of the Military Cross
British Army personnel of World War I
Stipendiary magistrates (England and Wales)
Machine Gun Corps officers